James Oatley (16 April 1817 – 31 December 1878) was an Australian politician.

Early life
He was born in Sydney, the second son of Staffordshire watchmaker and ex-convict James Oatley and his wife Mary. His father had arrived in Sydney with a life sentence on the Marquis of Wellington in January 1815. His mother and newborn older brother arrived free on the Northampton in June 1815.

On 1 January 1839 he married Eleanor Johnson at Sydney and they later had nine children. He was apprenticed to John Urquhart, a coachbuilder of George Street. After his father's death in 1839, Oatley inherited substantial property including a Cooks River grant his father received in 1833, the location of the family estate, Snugborough Park. From 1844 he was the licensee of the Sportsman Hotel on the corner of Pitt and Goulburn streets. He retired in 1852 to devote himself to public affairs. He was a horse owner and a subscriber to the Homebush races.

Oatley was commissioned as a Justice of the Peace. He was appointed to the Cooks River Road Trust in 1849, and was a member of the Australian Patriotic Association, and Officer of the Independent Order of Odd Fellows.

Mayor and parliamentarian

He was elected as a Councillor for the City of Sydney as alderman for Phillip Ward from 1 November 1852 until 31 December 1853 when the council was replaced by City Commissioners. He was re-elected unopposed for Phillip Ward, 11 April 1857 to 1 December 1867, and for Fitzroy Ward, 1 December 1868 to 1 December 1878. Oatley became a magistrate in 1859 and was elected Mayor in 1862. In 1864 he was elected to the New South Wales Legislative Assembly for Canterbury, serving until his retirement in 1869.

Following the death of his first wife Eleanor, Oatley married Margaret Curtis on 29 September 1870 at St Peter's church, Cooks River, and they had one daughter. He was an alderman on Paddington Council and mayor in 1876 and 1877. He was a Royal Commissioner on the Inquiry into Berrima Gaol in 1878.

References

 

1817 births
1878 deaths
Members of the New South Wales Legislative Assembly
Mayors and Lord Mayors of Sydney
19th-century Australian politicians
Mayors of Paddington (New South Wales)